Henry Chapman Pincher (29 March 1914 – 5 August 2014) was an English journalist, historian and novelist whose writing mainly focused on espionage and related matters, after some early books on scientific subjects.

Early life
Pincher was born in Ambala, Punjab, to English parents. His father, Richard Chapman Pincher (his family was from north Yorkshire) was a major in the British army stationed in India, and his mother Helen (née Foster), was an actress. Pincher senior was serving in the Northumberland Fusiliers when Chapman was born. The couple had married in 1913 in Pontefract.

The family returned home to Pontefract when Pincher was aged three, and he attended 13 different schools before the family settled in Darlington, where his father would later own a sweet shop and a pub on the River Tees. Aged 10, he won a scholarship to Darlington Grammar School where he took an interest in genetics, afterwards studying zoology and biology at King's College London. 

Chapman Pincher married Constance Sylvia Wolstenholme in 1965. Pincher had two children, but they were from a previous marriage. Pincher was married three times altogether.

Early career
His first teaching job as a physics master was at the Liverpool Institute High School for Boys where he took pride in writing agricultural journals. When World War II began, Pincher decided to join the Royal Armoured Corps to serve his country, mainly because he felt that was the right thing to do, and because his father was no longer in the Army by this point. Pincher was a Staff Officer in the Corps, which he grew to very much enjoy during his time in the military. He took a keen interest in the trade of weaponry and learned as much as he possibly could. Pincher eventually became a tank gunner. Pincher also grew interested in intelligence and how it related to military purposes. He learned quickly that there was a lot of lying going on that he believed he could get to the bottom of if someone would give him the chance in the first place. Pincher was contacted by the Daily Express for information about a new explosive that had been developed while he was researching rockets during his time in the Royal Armoured Corps. Pincher reported news of the development of RDX and would continually supply information of this sort, specifically about "V-1 flying bomb, the V-2 rocket and the atom bomb dropped on Hiroshima." The Daily Express could see the potential in the pieces which he sent in and when he finished his time in the Army, he was recruited by that newspaper. Pincher believed it was his job to keep the media informed on decisions the military took every day, and took joy in finding angles that nobody else could find.

Career
As a defense correspondent for the Daily Express, Pincher developed his own style of investigative journalism, actively seeking out high-level contacts to obtain secret information. Assigned to cover the stories of physicists Alan Nunn May and Klaus Fuchs, who in the early post-war years were unmasked as Soviet spies, espionage became a particular interest of Pincher's.

Pincher's career as a journalist thereon mainly involved uncovering Cold War secrets in London for the Daily Express. During his career, he had contacts within the British Government that suggested MI5 and MI6 could possibly be providing housing unwittingly for Soviet agents. Pincher always went "above and beyond" for his investigative reporting style, including checking people's personal phone calls and relentlessly importuning important people, such as Prime Minister Harold Wilson, for answers to questions that Pincher thought were being concealed from the public. He regularly provided exclusives that other journalists had missed, which led to his employers calling him "the lone wolf of Fleet Street". He made both friends and enemies in high places. In 1959, Prime Minister Harold Macmillan wrote to his Minister of Defence: "Can nothing be done to suppress or get rid of Chapman Pincher?" Pincher obtained the title "spy catcher" after he exposed several people as spies, including George Blake, an MI6 member who let close to one hundred Soviet spies get jobs at the embassy in London.

According to the historian E.P. Thompson, "The columns of the Daily Express are a kind of official urinal where high officials of MI5 and MI6 stand side-by-side patiently leaking... . Mr. Pincher is too self- important and light- witted to realize how often he is being used". In reply, Pincher said "If someone wants to come and tell me some news that nobody else knows and I make a lovely scoop of it, come on, use me!".

He won awards as Journalist of the Year in 1964, and Reporter of the Decade in 1966.

Later life and career

Pincher is best known as the author of the book Their Trade is Treachery (1981), in which he publicized for the first time the suspicions that MI5's former Director General Roger Hollis had been a spy for the Soviet Union, and described MI5's and MI6's internal inquiries into the matter. Pincher was at one point close to Peter Wright, who, he knew, suspected Harold Wilson of having been a Soviet agent, and according to the biography of Wilson written by Ben Pimlott, Pincher was trying to get information from Wright so that he could accuse Wilson in a public setting in the near future.

Wright, a retired MI5 Soviet counterespionage officer, was Pincher's main source for Their Trade is Treachery, along with MP Jonathan Aitken and Wright's former colleague Arthur S. Martin. Aitken, using information from retired CIA counterespionage chief James Jesus Angleton, wrote a highly confidential letter in early 1980 to Prime Minister Margaret Thatcher, outlining Angleton's suspicions of Hollis acting as a double agent.

Pincher became ensnared in 1986 in the Spycatcher affair, when Wright tried to publish his own book in Australia, in apparent violation of his oath-taking of the Official Secrets Act when he joined MI5. The matter led to prolonged legal wrangling, with the British government mounting a strong defence against publication, which was ultimately unsuccessful through three levels of the Australian court system. Wright was represented by the barrister Malcolm Turnbull who, in 2015, became the 29th Australian Prime Minister. During his cross-examination, Turnbull exposed the British Cabinet Secretary, Sir Robert Armstrong, in a clear lie. In the meantime, Spycatcher was published in the United States in mid-1987, where it became a best seller. Pincher was investigated and cleared of any wrongdoing, through a police investigation.

Death
Pincher died on 5 August 2014 at Kintbury in West Berkshire, aged 100 years old, having suffered a stroke seven weeks earlier. He died with his family by his side, talking about his time in espionage and the power it gave him in his career. Pincher's son reported that his last joke was "Tell them I'm out of scoops."

Publications
 The Breeding of Farm Animals (London: Penguin, 1946)
 Into the Atomic Age (London: Hutchinson, 1948)
 It's Fun Finding Out (with Bernard Wicksteed, 1950)
 "Secrets et mystères du monde animal" (spotlight on animals; London: Hutchinson and Co., 1950. Collection "les livres de la nature", préface de jean Rostand pour l'édition française, chez Stock 1952)
 Not with a Bang (novel, 1965)
 The Giant Killer (novel, 1967)
 The Penthouse Conspirators (novel; London: Michael Joseph, 1970)
 The Skeleton at the Villa Wolkonsky (novel; London: Michael Joseph, 1975)
 The Eye of the Tornado (novel; London: Michael Joseph, 1976)
 The Four Horses (1978)
 Inside Story (1978)
 Dirty Tricks (1980)
 Their Trade is Treachery (1981)
 The Private World of St John Terrapin (1982)
 Too Secret Too Long (1984)
 The Secret Offensive (1985)
 A Web of Deception: The Spycatcher Affair (London: Sidgwick and Jackson, 1987)
 Traitor: The Labyrinths of Treason.
 The Truth About Dirty Tricks (1990)
 Treachery: Betrayals, Blunders, and Cover-ups: Six Decades of Espionage Against America and Great Britain (New York: Random House, 2009; as Treachery: Betrayals, Blunders and Cover-Ups: Six Decades of Espionage 2011, Mainstream, UK)
 Chapman Pincher: Dangerous To Know (Biteback, 2014)

Footnotes

External links
 
 Harry Chapman Pincher: Ex-Daily Express journalist turns 100
 Obituary - Guardian
 Obituary - Daily Telegraph
 Profile by Richard Norton-Taylor (prompted by Pincher's death)

1914 births
2014 deaths
Alumni of King's College London
Fellows of King's College London
English autobiographers
British centenarians
British historians of espionage
English male journalists
English non-fiction writers
English male novelists
20th-century English novelists
20th-century English male writers
Men centenarians
British Army personnel of World War II
Royal Armoured Corps officers
British people in colonial India